Introducing Kenny Garrett is the debut album of Kenny Garrett recorded on December 28th, 1984. It features Garrett in a quintet with veteran trumpeter Woody Shaw, pianist Mulgrew Miller, bassist Nat Reeves and drummer Tony Reedus.

Track listing

Personnel
Musicians
 Kenny Garrett – alto saxophone
 Woody Shaw – trumpet, flugelhorn
 Mulgrew Miller – piano
 Nat Reeves – bass
 Tony Reedus – drums

Production
 Gerry Teekens - producer
 Jerry Teekens - associate producer

 Rudy Van Gelder - engineer
 Max Bolleman - engineer
 Leendert Stofbergen - cover design
 Stanley Crouch - liner Notes

References 

1985 albums
Kenny Garrett albums
Criss Cross Jazz albums
Albums recorded at Van Gelder Studio